Cindy Lou Ady  is a Canadian politician and was a member of the Legislative Assembly of Alberta.  She served in this capacity from the 2001 provincial election, being re-elected in both the 2004 provincial election and 2008 provincial election, until the 2012 election, sitting as a Progressive Conservative.  From 2008 to 2011, she served as the Minister of the Tourism, Parks and Recreation department in the Ed Stelmach government.  On March 5, 2012, Ady announced that she would not seek re-election in the upcoming provincial general election.

Early life

Ady was born in San Antonio, Texas and attended Brigham Young University from 1975 until 1979, where she studied Communications.  She owned a custom home construction business and was later, after moving to Canada, a self-employed community development consultant.  In this capacity she developed a business plan and funding proposal for Centennial High School, which opened in 2004.

Political career

Electoral record

Ady first sought public office in the 2001 provincial election in the constituency of Calgary-Shaw. In that election, she received 80.7% of the vote.  In 2004, she was re-elected with 63.4% of the vote, receiving the greatest percentage of the popular vote in Calgary next to Art Johnston, who garnered 63.8%. In the 2008 provincial election, Ady won her seat again, receiving 58.2% of the vote: the largest percentage of the popular vote of any elected Calgary MLA.

Backbencher

Ady started off as a backbencher in the Ralph Klein government.  During her first term, she sponsored the St. Mary's College Amendment Act, a private bill that allowed St. Mary's College to become a university college and grant degrees after being passed without objection.  During her second term she sponsored a pair of government bills.  The Pharmacy and Drug Amendment Act, which passed with all-party support, changed the regulatory regime faced by pharmacies and eliminated the requirement that doctors' prescriptions include a precise amount to be prescribed, to allow pharmacists some discretion on the question.  The Personal Directives Amendment Act amended the province's statute involving personal directives - a written instruction on personal matters to be brought into effect in the event of the director's incapacity - to allow them to be suspended in the event that somebody making one regains capacity.  It too passed with all-party support.

Minister
On June 21, Premier Ed Stelmach appointed Ady Associate Minister of Tourism Promotion as part of an effort to put more Calgarians in cabinet after his party lost the riding of Calgary Elbow to Liberal Craig Cheffins.  After the 2008 election, she was promoted to a full minister, of Tourism, Parks and Recreation.  In this capacity, she sponsored the Travel Alberta Act, which would establish Travel Alberta, hitherto a government department, as a statutory corporation. Ady has a strong record in terms of attendance in the legislature for Members. Her absenteeism is one of the lowest for all MLAs and Ministers. Ady's accessibility and use of resources to keep the public informed on key issues has been praised.  In October, 2011, she was replaced as Minister of Tourism, Parks and Recreation by Jack Hayden (politician).

Olympics
Minister Ady attended the 2010 Vancouver Winter Olympic Games, representing the Government of Alberta. Part of the government's advertising was showcased through exclusive booking of the Rocky Mountaineer, which did runs between Vancouver and Whistler. As part of her role as Minister for Tourism, Parks and Recreation, Ady also helped host a provincial pavilion known as Alberta House, at the corner of Beaty and Robson Streets in Vancouver. Some estimates have pegged the return on investment for the whole marketing project to be near $70 million, versus the $7 million initial investment. The Government of Alberta official report stated that the media exposure and return generated was worth nearly $70 million.

Post-Olympic Recreation Promotion
Following the 2010 Vancouver Winter Olympics, Minister Ady supported the establishment of an Olympic Legacy Network. Ady stated that the project looked to utilize, "...opportunities to use our Olympic legacies for the long-term benefit of sport and tourism." The project has already had success with the December 2010 Alberta/British Columbia Joint Legacy Event. This event hosted the World Championships for bobsleigh and skeleton racing in 2010.

Personal life

Ady is married to Don Ady, son of former Cardston and Cardston-Chief Mountain MLA Jack Ady, whom she identifies as her political hero.  The pair has four sons: Brent, Jeffrey, Justin, and Scott. They currently reside in south Calgary, within her riding of Calgary-Shaw. Ady is an active member of the Church of Jesus Christ of Latter-day Saints.

Election results

References

1950s births
Living people
Progressive Conservative Association of Alberta MLAs
American emigrants to Canada
Latter Day Saints from Utah
Brigham Young University alumni
Canadian Latter Day Saints
Politicians from San Antonio
Women MLAs in Alberta
Members of the Executive Council of Alberta
21st-century Canadian politicians
21st-century Canadian women politicians
Latter Day Saints from Texas